The Beezer was a long-running weekly British comic book, which was the home to 120 different comic strips over the years. First printed in 1956, it merged with the Cracker and Plug comic strips in 1976 and 1979 respectively. It was, then, renamed into The Beezer and Topper on merging with The Topper in 1990. However, publication ceased in 1993 eventually. After its closure, some of its characters appeared in The Beano and The Dandy.

The following is a list of Beezer comic strips, organized by year of release date and in chronological order:

{| id="toc" class="toc plainlinks" style="summary:Star Cinema films list"
! Contents: 
|
1950s: 19561957195819591960s: 1960196119621963196419651966196719691970s: 197019711972197419751976197819791980s: 1981198319841986198719881989
'See alsoReferences
|}

1956

1957

1958

1959

1960

1961

1962

1963

1964

1965

1966

1967

1969

1970

1971

1972

1974

1975

1976

1978

1979

1981

1983

1984

1986

1987

1988

1989

See alsoThe BeanoList of Beano comic strips
List of Beano comic strips by annualThe DandyList of Dandy comic stripsThe Beezer''
List of Beezer and Topper comic strips

References

Comics anthologies
British comics
Beezer